Planet Fire  may refer to:

 Fire (LEXX), fictional planet in the television series Lexx
 Planet Fire (Shadow Planets), fictional planet in the 3D CG animated television series Shadow Raiders